Homer Whelchel (December 31, 1899 – August 12, 1974) was an American athlete. He competed in the men's javelin throw at the 1924 Summer Olympics.

References

External links

1899 births
1974 deaths
Athletes (track and field) at the 1924 Summer Olympics
American male javelin throwers
Olympic track and field athletes of the United States
People from Dawson County, Georgia